Montoursville Area High School is a small suburban/rural public high school located at 100 North Arch Street, Montoursville, Pennsylvania.  It is the sole high school operated by the Montoursville Area School District. The school serves the borough of Montoursville, plus the townships of Fairfield, Upper Fairfield, Eldred, Gamble, Cascade, and Plunketts Creek.  In 2013, Montoursville Area School District enrollment was reported as 598 pupils in 9th through 12th grades. The school employed 44 teachers in the 2012–2013 school year.

In September 2014, the Montoursville Area School Board approved a plan to spend over $35.9 million to do extensive renovations to the high school building including adding two floors. The project has since been completed in 2017. The renovated building will change the main entrance to Mulberry Street. There will also be a new auditorium to include a theater and lobby area. Sports facilities will be added. This renovation has provided a total of 36 new classrooms and labs.

Extracurriculars
The Montoursville Area School District offers a wide variety of clubs, activities and an extensive, publicly funded sports program.

The sports programs are associated with the Pennsylvania Heartland Athletic Conference and the Pennsylvania Interscholastic Athletic Association. The Pennsylvania Heartland Athletic Conference is a voluntary association of 25 PIAA High Schools within the central Pennsylvania region.

TWA Flight 800
Sixteen students and five adult chaperones from the school's French club were killed in the 1996 crash of TWA Flight 800.

Sports
The district funds:

Varsity

Boys
Baseball - AAA
Basketball- AAA
Cross country - AA
Football - AA
Golf - AA
Soccer - AA
Swimming and diving - AA
Tennis - AA
Track and field - AA
Wrestling - AA

Girls
Basketball - AA
Cross country - AA
Golf - AA
Soccer - AA
Softball - AA
Swimming and diving - AAA
Tennis - AA
Track and field - AA

According to PIAA directory July 2013

References

External links

 BLaST Intermediate Unit

Public high schools in Pennsylvania
Schools in Lycoming County, Pennsylvania
Susquehanna Valley